Peru Township is one of fourteen townships in Miami County, Indiana, United States. As of the 2020 census, its population was 10,638 and it contained 5,195 housing units.

History
Peru Township was organized in 1834.

Geography
The Wabash River defines the southern border of the township.

Cities, towns, villages
 Peru (northwest three-quarters)

Unincorporated towns
 Oakdale at 
 Ridgeview at 
(This list is based on USGS data and may include former settlements.)

Extinct towns
 Brownell

Cemeteries
The township contains these three cemeteries: Bowman, Mount Hope and Schrock.

Major highways
  U.S. Route 24
  U.S. Route 31

Airports and landing strips
 Benner Field

School districts
 Peru Community Schools

Political districts
 Indiana's 5th congressional district
 State House District 23
 State Senate District 18

References
 
 United States Census Bureau 2008 TIGER/Line Shapefiles
 IndianaMap

External links
 Indiana Township Association
 United Township Association of Indiana
 City-Data.com page for Peru Township

Townships in Miami County, Indiana
Townships in Indiana